The Stronetta, or Rio Stronetta, is a small mountain torrent in the Province of Verbano Cusio Ossola, northern Italy.

It rises in the mountains to the south-east of Gravellona Toce and flows through the industrial district of the town, and into Lago Maggiore at Fondotoce, a locality of Verbania. A peculiarity of the river is that in places it is entirely covered by vegetation, and can be difficult to make out.

Sources
This original version of this article included text translated from its counterpart in the Italian Wikipedia.

Rivers of Italy
Rivers of the Province of Verbano-Cusio-Ossola
Rivers of the Alps